Kinnie Laisné (born 11 July 1989) is a former French tennis player.

Laisné has a career-high singles ranking by the Women's Tennis Association (WTA) of 295, achieved on 17 August 2009. She also has a career-high WTA doubles ranking of 381, achieved on 21 December 2009. Laisné won one singles title and three doubles titles on the ITF Women's Circuit.

Laisné made her main-draw debut on the WTA Tour at the 2008 Tashkent Open in the doubles tournament, partnering Katie O'Brien.

ITF finals

Singles: 1–2

Doubles: 3–3

External links
 
 

1989 births
Living people
French female tennis players
People from Cherbourg-Octeville
Sportspeople from Manche